Siam Shade is the debut EP and first release by the Japanese rock band Siam Shade. It was released on December 10, 1994. It was previously released as a demo tape on May 1, 1993.

The track list of this EP was remastered and re-released in April 2012 and was titled Siam Shade Spirits 1993.

Track listing

References

1994 EPs
Siam Shade albums